IWBank S.p.A. is an Italian online bank owned by Intesa Sanpaolo. The bank characterises its offer for economic convenience and high technological content.

History

The bank originated from @Imiweb Sim, that Imi Bank started in 1999 as a trading service for its customers. In 2001 it became a bank with the name of Imiweb Bank.

In 2003 Centrobanca (BPU Group investment bank) took over 80% of Imiweb Bank, changing the name in IWBank and achieving an even balance.
The management acquired a 29% stake in 2004 and the offer was extended.

External links
IWBank main website

Banks of Italy
UBI Banca